Yusuf Isa Halim (also transliterated in Romanian as Iusuf Isa Halim) (1894–1982) was a Dobrujan-born Tatar poet, schoolteacher and linguist known for authoring the first Romanian-Turkish dictionary.

Biography 
Yusuf Isa was born in 1894 in Bílbíl, today officially known as Ciocârlia, a Nogai village situated in the Tatar countryside west of Mangalia, in Dobruja.
He graduated in 1915 from the Medrese of Medğidiye/Medgidia and he served as a schoolteacher in Malşuwa/Abrud, Kavarna, Pazarjik, Bogaz-Kóy (Cernavodă). In 1930 he published in Pazarjik, now Dobrich in Bulgaria, the first Romanian-Turkish dictionary.

See also
 Tatars in Romania

Citations

Sources 

 
 
 

1894 births
Crimean Tatar writers
Crimean Tatar poets
Crimean Tatar schoolteachers
Crimean Tatar linguists
Crimean Tatar culture
Romanian male poets
Romanian schoolteachers
Linguists from Romania
Romanian people of Crimean Tatar descent
People from Constanța County
1982 deaths
20th-century Romanian poets
20th-century Romanian male writers
20th-century linguists